Lashkari ibn Muhammad ibn Shaddad was a Kurdish ruler, the son of Muhammad ibn Shaddad who succeeded his father to the throne of the Shaddadids in 971. Along with his brothers, he captured Ganja from the Sallarids in 971, coming into control of the region of Arran. After his death in 978, he was succeeded by his brother Marzuban ibn Muhammad.

Sources
 
 

978 deaths
Emirs of Ganja
Shaddadids
10th-century Kurdish people